Kolaghat Government Polytechnic, established in 2014,  is a government polytechnic located in Kolaghat,  Purba Medinipur district, West Bengal.

About college
This polytechnic is affiliated to the West Bengal State Council of Technical Education,  and recognized by AICTE, New Delhi. This polytechnic offers diploma courses in Electrical Power Systems and Electrical Engineering Industrial Control.

See also

References

External links

Official website WBSCTE

Universities and colleges in Purba Medinipur district
Educational institutions established in 2014
2014 establishments in West Bengal
Technical universities and colleges in West Bengal